The full name of Liuhe First School (六合一中) is Liuhe Senior High School of Jiangsu Province (江苏省六合高级中学). It has changed names for five times and changed its location for three times. The Liuhe High School has almost 70 years of history. It covers an area of 160 acres.

Awards received 
It was confirmed as one of 95 Best High Schools which were built first in 1980. In 1991, it acquired acceptance as the Provincial Key Middle School. It was confirmed as "National Demonstration High School" in April 2002. In 2004, the Liuhe Senior High School of JIangsu Province 
was awarded as a four-star senior high school of Jiangsu province. "五一" labor medal winner and provincial first-grade senior teacher: one person; city labor model: 2 persons; leaders of city and district and the teachers in the outstanding field: 58 persons.

References 

Schools in Nanjing